Blažena Holišová (11 July 1930 – 7 April 2011) was a Czech actress. She starred in the 1969/1970 film Witchhammer under director Otakar Vávra.
Holisová died on 7 April 2011. She was 80 years old.

Partial filmography

 Skola otcu (1957) - Andulka Novotná
 Touha (1958)
 Zivot pro Jana Kaspara (1959) - Jana Vánová
 U nás v Mechově (1960) - Ema Sikulová
 Pohled do ocí (1961) - Hanka Vitáková
 Death is Called Engelchen (1963) - rádová sestra Alzbeta
 Marie (1964)
 Zlatá reneta (1965) - Karla Skálová, Martina sestra
 Dva tygri (1968) - Lebedová
 Witchhammer (1970) - Sattlerová
 Hroch (1973)
 Kdo hledá zlaté dno (1974) - Petrina matka
 Dvacátý devátý (1974) - Marie Zápotocká
 My Brother Has a Cute Brother (1975) - Vránová
 Prodaná nevesta (1976) - Krusinová
 Bájecní muzi s klikou (1979) - vdova Evzenie Slavíková
 Brácha za vsechny penize (1979) - Vránová, matka Zuzany
 Indiáni z Vetrova (1979) - Uklízecka
 Julek (1980) - Director of Arena
 Úteky domu (1980) - Matka
 Pul domu bez zenicha (1981) - Zofie, Francova zena
 Zlatá slepice (1981) - Aunt
 Zahrada deti (1981) - Eliska Vondrová
 Pozor, vizita! (1982) - Katka
 Poslední vlak (1983) - Sanderová
 Slavnosti snezenek (1984) - Francova zena
 Rozpustený a vypustený (1985) - Matka Hlavácková
 Zátah (1985) - Pokladní
 Kam doskáce ranní ptáce (1987) - domovcine Mrázová
 Mág (1988) - Máchova matka
 Jak básníkum chutná zivot (1988) - Hubácková

References

1930 births
2011 deaths
Czech film actresses
20th-century Czech actresses
Janáček Academy of Music and Performing Arts alumni
Czech stage actresses
Czech television actresses
People from Hodonín District